Terry McGuirk is the chairman of Major League Baseball's Atlanta Braves. Since graduating from Middlebury College in 1973, McGuirk has also been with Turner Broadcasting System, where he served as CEO from 1996 to 2001 and now serves as vice chairman.

As chairman of the Atlanta Braves, McGuirk oversaw the development of and move to Truist Park and an "astounding" 47 percent revenue increase in 2017.

References

External links
11 Alive: Braves new boss to improve image
Braves Front Office

Middlebury College alumni
Atlanta Braves executives
Living people
Major League Baseball team presidents
Year of birth missing (living people)